Judd Asher Nelson (born November 28, 1959) is an American actor. He is best known for his roles as John Bender in The Breakfast Club, Alec Newbury in St. Elmo's Fire, Joe Hunt in Billionaire Boys Club, Nick Peretti in New Jack City, Billy Beretti in Empire, and Jack Richmond in the television series Suddenly Susan.

Early life 
Nelson was born in Portland, Maine, the son of Merle (née Royte), a court mediator and former member of the Maine House of Representatives, and Leonard Nelson, a corporate lawyer. His family is Jewish. His father was the first Jewish president of the Portland Symphony Orchestra. He has two sisters, Eve and Julie.

He went to school at St. Paul's School in Concord, New Hampshire and Waynflete School in Portland, Maine. He studied at Haverford College in Pennsylvania, leaving during his sophomore year. He subsequently moved to Manhattan to study acting with Stella Adler.

Career

1980s 
Nelson began acting in the mid-1980s, starring in Making the Grade  (1984), and in Fandango (1985) opposite Kevin Costner.  It was his roles in John Hughes's The Breakfast Club (1985) and Joel Schumacher's St. Elmo's Fire (1985) – and his affiliation with the Brat Pack – that made Nelson a star, along with Emilio Estevez, Anthony Michael Hall, Rob Lowe, Andrew McCarthy, Demi Moore, Molly Ringwald, and Ally Sheedy. The St. Elmo's Fire (Man in Motion) music video – also directed by Schumacher – reached No. 1 in the US (1985). It was written by David Foster and John Parr and performed by John Parr. Nelson appears in the video. A subsequent article in New York magazine, which focused primarily on the success of these films, resulted in the term "Brat Pack" being coined.

In 1986 Nelson provided the voice of Hot Rod/Rodimus Prime in The Transformers: The Movie and teamed up with Breakfast Club alumna Ally Sheedy for a third time in Blue City. He also provided narration for Bill Couturie's Dear America: Letters Home from Vietnam, a critically acclaimed war documentary that featured a cast including Tom Berenger, Robert De Niro, Willem Dafoe, and Matt Dillon. Film critic Roger Ebert praised the documentary, and it maintains a 100% rating on Rotten Tomatoes.

He starred opposite Burt Reynolds in the ABC Afterschool Special Shattered If Your Kid's On Drugs, which also featured Megan Follows and Dermot Mulroney. In 1987 he starred in the Bob Clark courtroom comedy From the Hip, which co-starred John Hurt and Elizabeth Perkins; he also provided a stand-out performance in Billionaire Boys Club, a courtroom thriller based on actual events; his performance earned him a Golden Globe Award nomination for Best Actor in a Mini-Series.  In late 1988 he played Konstantin in Chekhov's The Seagull directed by Charles Marowitz at the Los Angeles Theatre Center, earning praise, as did the entire production.

Nelson closed the 1980s with the William Lustig thriller, Relentless (1989), in which he plays a Los Angeles serial killer hunted by two police officers (Robert Loggia and Leo Rossi); he provided a cameo in the Adam Rifkin road film Never on Tuesday (1989) along with Nicolas Cage, Cary Elwes, Emilio Estevez and Charlie Sheen; and appeared in Tommy Chong's Far Out Man (1989) with Rae Dawn Chong and C. Thomas Howell.

Key TV roles in the 1980s included Moonlighting (1986) – episode "Camille" – in which he played a police officer opposite Cybill Shepherd and Bruce Willis.

1990s 
Nelson began the 1990s with a starring role opposite Max von Sydow in the World War II drama Hiroshima: Out of the Ashes (1990). The film focused on the horror of the Hiroshima bombing. It co-stars Mako Iwamatsu and Pat Morita.  In the Fall of 1990 he appeared on stage in Chicago and New York in Jules Feiffer's Carnal Knowledge with Jon Cryer.  He then worked for a second time with Adam Rifkin, this time starring in The Dark Backward (1991) with Bill Paxton. This quirky comedy featured fellow actor Rob Lowe, as well as Lara Flynn Boyle, James Caan, and Wayne Newton. Nelson plays the worst comedian in stand-up comedy history.

In 1991, he had a starring role in the Mario Van Peebles-directed New Jack City, an urban gangster film with Wesley Snipes, Ice-T, Vanessa A. Williams, and Chris Rock. The film was a commercial success. He then had a special guest appearance in the popular HBO TV series Tales from the Crypt – on the episode What's Cookin (1992) – with Christopher Reeve and Meat Loaf, followed by a starring role with Richard Jordan in the thriller Primary Motive (1992), and a similar role in Entangled (1993) opposite Pierce Brosnan, which was set in Paris.

In 1994 Nelson appeared with Steve Buscemi, Chris Farley, and Adam Sandler in the comedy Airheads, with Gina Gershon in the psychological thriller Flinch, and with then partner Shannen Doherty in the thriller Blindfold: Acts of Obsession. Nelson wrote, produced, and starred in the thriller Every Breath in which he co-starred with Joanna Pacula. He headlined the Australian thriller, Blackwater Trail (1995), with Peter Phelps. He had a starring role on the NBC television sitcom Suddenly Susan (1996), which saw success for a four-season run. He had a starring role in the Shaquille O'Neal movie Steel (1997). The film also starred Annabeth Gish and Richard Roundtree (Steel was a commercial flop).

Nelson wrapped up the 1990s with another urban gangster thriller, Light It Up (film) (1999), which featured an ensemble cast including R&B singer/actor Usher Raymond (in his first leading role), Rosario Dawson, Forest Whitaker, and Vanessa L. Williams. He played Alan Freed in the latter's life story, Mr. Rock 'N' Roll: The Alan Freed Story (1999) opposite Mädchen Amick and Paula Abdul.

2000s to present day
In the 21st century, Nelson has appeared in such TV series as The Outer Limits (2000), CSI: Crime Scene Investigation (2006), CSI: NY (2007), Las Vegas (2007), Eleventh Hour (2008) as a psychologist researching soldiers returning from Iraq who suffer from posttraumatic stress disorder, Psych (2010), and a recurring role in Two and a Half Men (2010) with Charlie Sheen.

Films include the psychological thriller Cabin by the Lake (2000), its sequel Return to Cabin by the Lake (2001), and a cameo appearance in the 2001 film Jay and Silent Bob Strike Back; the film's writer-director, Kevin Smith, had been a long-time fan of Nelson and the "Brat Pack" films. In 2002 he co-starred with Lauren Holly in Santa, Jr. and reprised his role as John Bender in an episode of Family Guy (2007). Later, Nelson reprised his role of Rodimus Prime in Transformers Animated (2009) and appeared in The Boondock Saints II: All Saints Day (2009), the latter with Julie Benz, Billy Connolly, Sean Patrick Flanery, and Peter Fonda.

He portrayed Father Charley Lock on Brookwood Sleazebags (2010), a pilot he did for HBO. In 2012, Nelson played the role of Headmaster Nash in the live-action feature film Bad Kids Go to Hell, based on the graphic novel of the same name. The same year, Nelson co-wrote and starred in the short film The Spin Room: Super Tuesday. Nelson reprised his role as Rodimus in Transformers: Animated and voiced Ben 10,000, Eon, and Atomic-X in Ben 10: Omniverse.

In 2013, Nelson authored four books released on Kindle: The Power of Speech, Nine of Diamonds, The Gig, and Water Music.

Nelson played a pivotal role in the final season of Nikita.

Nelson played a lead role in the 2010 Hallmark movie, Cancel Christmas. He portrayed Chris Frost, who is also Santa Claus. In 2019, he starred in the suspense thriller, “Dead Water”.

In 2021, Nelson starred as Don Cody in the Lifetime film Girl in the Basement which was inspired by the Fritzl case.

Filmography

Film

Television

Music videos

References

External links 

1959 births
20th-century American male actors
21st-century American male actors
American male film actors
American male stage actors
American male television actors
American male voice actors
Haverford College alumni
Jewish American male actors
Living people
Male actors from Portland, Maine
St. Paul's School (New Hampshire) alumni
Waynflete School alumni
21st-century American Jews
American expatriate male actors in the United Kingdom